"Small Town Boy" is a song recorded by American country music artist Dustin Lynch. It was released to country radio on February 17, 2017 as the second single from his third studio album, Current Mood.

Background 
The song was written by Rhett Akins, Kyle Fishman and Ben Hayslip and produced by Zach Crowell. They wrote the song while on Luke Bryan's annual Farm Tour around October 2016, and sent the song to Dustin Lynch in November. Lynch listened to the song while on a hunt and decided to record it for his third album.

The song was first released for sale on February 17, 2017, and then to radio with an add date of March 20, 2017.

Commercial reception 
The song reached No. 1 on Billboards Country Airplay chart in September 2017, which is Lynch's fifth No. 1 on the chart. It stayed at No. 1 for four weeks on the chart.  It also peaked at No. 2 on Billboards Hot Country Songs for chart dated August 19, 2017. The song was certified Gold by the RIAA on July 21, 2017, and Platinum on January 19, 2018 for a million units in sales and streams. It has sold 497,000 copies in the United States as of January 2018.

Music video 
The music video premiered on June 9, 2017, to a crowd at Nissan Stadium during 2017's CMA Fest as well as to a Vevo
audience. In the video, Lynch is featured with Australian actress Claire Holt as the two enjoy their love for each other, throughout the day and night, on a beach. It was filmed on El Matador Beach in Malibu, CA.

Charts

Weekly charts

Year-end charts

Decade-end charts

Certifications

References 

2017 songs
2017 singles
Dustin Lynch songs
BBR Music Group singles
Songs written by Rhett Akins
Songs written by Ben Hayslip